Marcel Hoffmeier (born 15 July 1999) is a German footballer who plays for  club SC Paderborn as a midfielder.

Career 
Hoffmeier started his career at Lippstadt club Rot-Weiß Horn and moved to the youth team of SV Lippstadt 08 in 2009, where he also made his first appearances in the men's division in the Regionalliga West and Oberliga Westfalen in the 2018–19 season. For the 2019–20 season, he moved to 3. Liga team SC Preussen Münster, where he had his first professional appearance in an away 4–2 defeat at FSV Zwickau.

On 4 June 2022, Hoffmeier signed with SC Paderborn.

References 

1999 births
People from Geseke
Sportspeople from Arnsberg (region)
Footballers from North Rhine-Westphalia
Living people
German footballers
Association football midfielders
SC Preußen Münster players
SV Lippstadt 08 players
SC Paderborn 07 players
Regionalliga players
3. Liga players
2. Bundesliga players